Akhorwal or Akhurwal is a town in Darra Adam Khel in Frontier Region Kohat of the Federally Administered Tribal Areas of Pakistan. Akhorwal has a population of 22,559 according to the 2017 Census of Pakistan. It is located between the cities of Peshawar and Kohat. It is home to FATA University.

History
After coal mines were discovered in Akhorwal, people of the region disputed how the income from mines should be distributed. On July 23, 2017 an official decision was made for the Pirwal Khel sub-tribe to receive 27 percent of the income, the Bulaki Khel to receive 36.5 percent, and the Gadiya Khel to receive 36.5 percent.

See also
Darra Adam Khel
FATA University

References

Populated places in Frontier Region Kohat